Smokin' Aces is a 2006 American action comedy film written and directed by Joe Carnahan. The film centers on the chase for Las Vegas magician turned mafia informant Robert 'Buddy Aces' Israel (Jeremy Piven), on whom a one-million-dollar bounty is placed. The ensemble cast includes Ryan Reynolds, Ben Affleck, Jason Bateman, Common, Andy García, Alicia Keys, Taraji P. Henson, Ray Liotta, Chris Pine, and Matthew Fox, all co-starring as the various individuals attempting to either capture, kill or protect Israel.

Smokin' Aces was the official acting debut of Keys and Common. The film is set in Lake Tahoe and was mainly filmed at MontBleu Resort Casino & Spa, called the "Nomad Casino". It received mixed reviews, and grossed $57 million at the box office. It was followed by a 2010 prequel, Smokin' Aces 2: Assassins' Ball, directed by P. J. Pesce and produced and co-written by Carnahan.

Plot
Las Vegas magician and wannabe gangster Buddy "Aces" Israel is in hiding at a Lake Tahoe hotel while his agent negotiates a potential immunity deal with FBI Deputy Director Stanley Locke. Special Agents Richard Messner and Donald Carruthers learn that ailing mob boss Primo Sparazza has issued a $1 million bounty on Israel and sent a mysterious "Swede" to bring him Israel's heart. A number of assassins also seek the reward: master of disguise Lazlo Soot; hitwomen Sharice Watters and Georgia Sykes, hired by Sparazza's underboss; mercenary Pasquale Acosta; and psychotic neo-Nazi brothers Darwin, Jeeves, and Lester Tremor.

Locke sends Messner and Carruthers to take Israel into protective custody. Bail bondsmen Jack Dupree, "Pistol" Pete Deeks, and Hollis Elmore have been hired by the law firm that posted Israel's bail to capture him as well. The bondsmen are attacked by the Tremors, and only Elmore escapes alive. Messner visits the murder scene while Carruthers proceeds to the hotel, which each of the assassins have infiltrated. Carruthers recognizes Acosta, disguised as a security officer, in an elevator and both are mortally wounded in the ensuing gunfight.

Soot gains access to Israel's penthouse, posing as his henchman Hugo. Sir Ivy, Israel's second-in-command, confronts Israel for agreeing to inform on Ivy and his entourage as part of the plea deal, and is subdued by hotel security. In Los Angeles, Locke abruptly withdraws from the deal with Israel and orders that Messner and Carruthers not be told. The Tremor brothers reach the penthouse floor and attack the security team and Ivy, who kills Jeeves and Lester. Israel, learning Locke has terminated the plea deal, attempts suicide.

Finding Carruthers and Acosta, Sykes is cornered when Messner sets up a position around the elevator. Watters provides cover from a nearby hotel with an M82 sniper rifle, outgunning Messner's team. Acosta wounds Sykes, but is shot by a dying Carruthers. Believing Sykes is dead, Watters continues shooting at the FBI. Sykes escapes to the penthouse, where she stops Darwin Tremor before he can kill Ivy. Tremor escapes, and Messner, distraught over Carruthers' death, stops Ivy and Sykes on the stairwell but lets them go. Seeing the pair alive and free through her rifle scope, Watters is gunned down by the FBI.

Locke and his team descend on the hotel and take Israel to the hospital. Soot escapes, while Acosta is carted away on a gurney, still alive, and Darwin is gunned down by Elmore. At the hospital, Messner learns the truth from Locke: the Swede is a prominent heart surgeon, and Soot was hired to retrieve Israel's heart as a transplant for Sparazza; Israel is Sparazza's illegitimate son and most compatible donor. Sparazza is revealed to be Freeman Heller, a former undercover FBI agent who was thought to have been killed by the mob. In reality, the FBI attempted to kill Heller for blurring the lines between mobster and agent. Heller survived, permanently adopting the identity of Sparazza.

Messner is furious over the unnecessary deaths of Carruthers and his fellow agents, and Locke's plan to complete the transplant, sacrificing Israel to save Sparazza and exploit his decades of criminal operations. Ordered to keep quiet, Messner instead locks himself in the operating room and takes Israel and Sparazza off life support, killing them both. As Locke and his men desperately try to break in, Messner lays his gun and badge on the floor, apparently resigning from the FBI.

Cast
 Ben Affleck as Jack Dupree, a world-weary Las Vegas bail bondsman who is hired to bring Buddy Israel back from Lake Tahoe and see that he makes his next court appearance.
 Ryan Reynolds as Richard Messner, an FBI special agent assigned to protect Israel and ensure his testimony.
 Andy Garcia as Stanley Locke, Deputy Director of the FBI and the agent heading the case against Sparazza.
 Chris Pine as Darwin Tremor, the eldest of the Tremor brothers, a trio of redneck, speed-freak, neo-Nazi skinhead hitmen with a penchant for scorched earth tactics. They get wind of the hit on Israel and decide to home in on the action.
 Common as "Sir Ivy", Israel's head of security.
 Jeremy Piven as Robert 'Buddy Aces' Israel: A washed-up, drug-addled magician targeted for assassination.
 Ray Liotta as Donald Carruthers, Messner's partner.
 Tommy Flanagan as Lazlo Soot, a legendary Hungarian hitman and master of disguise who wears realistic latex masks. He agrees to kill Israel and bring his heart to Sparazza.
 Joseph Ruskin as Primo Sparazza, an aging Las Vegas mob boss.
 Mike Falkow as Freeman Heller, a legendary Federal agent who was the first to successfully infiltrate the Mafia.
 Alex Rocco as Sidney Serna, Sparazza's underboss who is scheming with Victor 'Baby Buzz' Padiche to takeover the mob.
 David Proval as Victor "Baby Buzz" Padiche, he is a top Capo in the mob and is scheming with Sidney Serna to take over the mob.
 Alicia Keys as Georgia Sykes, a contract killer. She and her partner, Sharice Watters, are hired by Serna to abduct Israel from his hotel before Soot can kill him.
 Taraji P. Henson as Sharice Watters, a contract killer and the partner of Georgia Sykes.
 Néstor Carbonell as Pasquale "El Estrago" Acosta, a Spanish mercenary notorious for both his love of torture and his having chewed off his own fingertips while in SAS custody to avoid identification by Interpol. He learns of the contract on Israel and tries to collect on it himself. In the film they say his nickname "El Estrago" means "The Plague" in Spanish. His nickname translated means "The Damage".
 Kevin Durand as Jeeves Tremor, the largest and youngest of the Tremor brothers.
 Maury Sterling as Lester Tremor, the smallest of the Tremor brothers.
 Curtis Armstrong as Morris Mecklen, Israel's business manager and acting lawyer.
 Jason Bateman as Rupert "Rip" Reed, an insecure, disheveled, and perverse attorney with any number of paraphilias and addictions. His law firm bailed Israel out of jail, so he hires bounty hunters, Jack Dupree, "Pistol" Pete Deeks, and Hollis Elmore, to get him back before he officially jumps and they forfeit the bond.
 Vladimir Kulich as Dr. Sven "The Swede" Ingstrom, feared to be a mysterious assassin, but is actually a renowned heart surgeon. 
 Peter Berg as Peter "Pistol Pete" Deeks, a former Las Vegas vice cop fired from the force for corruption. He and his partner Hollis are hired by Dupree to help him recover Israel.
 Martin Henderson as Hollis Elmore, a former Las Vegas vice cop and the partner of Pistol Pete. He was not corrupt, but took the fall anyway for sticking with Pete.
 Joel Edgerton as Hugo Croop, an Eastern European bodyguard and hanger-on. 
 Christopher Michael Holley as "Beanie", Israel's favorite procurer. It is revealed in Smokin' Aces 2: Assassins' Ball that "Beanie" is actually an alias. His real name is Malcolm Little, and he is an undercover FBI agent.
 Davenia McFadden as Loretta Wyman, Georgia and Sharice's manager.
 Matthew Fox as Bill, the head of security at the Lake Tahoe hotel where much of the action occurs.

Wayne Newton makes a cameo appearance as himself. Joe Carnahan, the film's writer-director, makes a cameo as an armed robber at the beginning of the film.

Title sequence
During the making of the film, Joe Carnahan's on-set photographer captured thousands of stills. These stills (over 3,000) were given to the London-based studio VooDooDog, who found sequential photographs that could be animated into title sequences. The images were then manipulated using After Effects, giving control of camera movement and depth of field. The sequence takes inspirations from Butch Cassidy and the Sundance Kid and other 1970s movies. To give the rostrum type hand-made feel, ink textures were filmed using a Canon 5D stills camera. Originally two sequences were produced, an opening sequence and end sequence. However, only the end sequence was used.

"Yes, Joe liked the opening credits we did but after their edit they felt it slowed the momentum of the introduction. That seems to be a big concern for filmmakers now—they're aware of the short attention span of audiences and don't want to delay the story. As a designer, I am not sure I would agree, of course. I think that if credit sequences are good and entertaining, they can hold an audience's attention".

Soundtrack
The movie itself contains 18 songs, leaving only one out of the official soundtrack which was "Spottieottiedopaliscious" by Outkast. The score music was composed by Clint Mansell who has also scored such movies as The Fountain and Requiem for a Dream.

Track listing

Release and reception

Box office
According to Box Office Mojo, the movie grossed $14,638,755 on its opening weekend (2,218 theaters, averaging $6,599 per theater).
The movie grossed a total of $35,662,731 in the North American market and $21,600,709 outside the United States, making a total worldwide gross of $57,263,440.

Critical reception
Smokin' Aces has an approval rating of 31% on Rotten Tomatoes, based on 159 reviews, with an average score of 4.50/10. The site's critical consensus reads, "A violent mess of a movie, Smokin' Aces has some of Quentin Tarantino's style but not much of his wit or humor". On Metacritic, the film has a score of 45 out of 100, based on 32 critics, indicating "mixed or average reviews". Audiences surveyed by CinemaScore gave the film a grade "B" on scale of A to F.

David Denby of The New Yorker gave a negative review of the film, stating that it has "a rabid, itchy, crack-den heartlessness to it—screw-you nihilism as a joke" and "has been made with the kind of antic violence that wins a movie the honorific title of "black comedy." What that indicates in this case is that nothing makes sense—and that's supposed to be cool." Peter Travers of Rolling Stone gave the film three out of four stars; although he noted that the film has "too many characters and too many plot strands" as well as an abrupt ending, he stated that the film is "shamelessly and unapologetically a guy movie... Carnahan can still fire up action and laughs like nobody's business."

During a rare talk session for Princeton University's series of film screenings in October 2016, director Terrence Malick praised the film, stating that it was "very well directed" and impressive in how it was able to balance numerous plotlines.

The film has developed a cult following since the 2010s.

Home media

Smokin' Aces was released on DVD on April 17, 2007 and sold 1,853,397 DVD units which produced a revenue of $35,714,831, or more than double the movie's budget. It was later released on Blu-ray on January 19, 2010 and then on Ultra HD Blu-ray on May 3, 2022.

Prequel 

On July 17, 2007, director Joe Carnahan announced that production had been approved by Universal Pictures for a second Smokin' Aces film, which he would not direct. The film is a prequel to the original and was released straight to DVD on January 19, 2010.

References

External links

 
 
 

2006 films
2000s crime films
American action thriller films
American crime thriller films
American LGBT-related films
French action thriller films
British action thriller films
Films about contract killing
American gangster films
Lesbian-related films
Working Title Films films
Films directed by Joe Carnahan
Films scored by Clint Mansell
Films set in California
Films set in Nevada
Films shot in Nevada
English-language French films
Relativity Media films
StudioCanal films
Universal Pictures films
2006 action films
Films with screenplays by Joe Carnahan
2000s English-language films
2000s American films
2000s British films
2000s French films